is a highway in Japan on the island of Honshū which runs from Niigata City in Niigata Prefecture to Sōma in Fukushima Prefecture.

Route data
Length: 232.7 km (145 mi)
Origin: Chuo-ku, Niigata (originates at junction with Routes 7, 8, 17, 49 and 116)
Terminus: Sōma, Fukushima
Major cities: Niigata

Municipalities passed through
Niigata Prefecture
Niigata (Chuo-ku - Higashi-ku - Kita-ku) - Seirō - Shibata - Tainai - Arakawa - Sekikawa
Yamagata Prefecture
Oguni - Iide - Kawanishi - Nagai - Nan'yō - Takahata
Miyagi Prefecture
Shichikashuku - Shiroishi - Kakuda - Marumori
Fukushima Prefecture
Shinchi - Sōma

See also

References

External links

113
Roads in Fukushima Prefecture
Roads in Miyagi Prefecture
Roads in Niigata Prefecture
Roads in Yamagata Prefecture